Gustavo Jorge Costa (born 22 November 1965) is an Argentine former professional footballer who played as a midfielder.

Career
Acosta started his career with Argentine side Ferro (Argentina) where he made 170 league appearances and scored ten goals, helping them win their only two top flight titles. In 1991, Acosta signed for FC St. Pauli in the German second division. In 1992, he signed for German third division club SV Lurup. In 1993, he signed for Lleida in the Spanish second division, helping them earn promotion to the Spanish La Liga. In 1994, Acosta signed for Argentine second division team Nueva Chicago.

References

External links
 

1965 births
Living people
Sportspeople from Mar del Plata
Argentine footballers
Association football midfielders
2. Bundesliga players
Segunda División players
FC St. Pauli players
UE Lleida players
Cádiz CF players
Ferro Carril Oeste footballers
Nueva Chicago footballers
Argentine Primera División players
Primera Nacional players
Argentine expatriate footballers
Argentine expatriate sportspeople in Germany
Expatriate footballers in Germany
Argentine expatriate sportspeople in Spain
Expatriate footballers in Spain